Singanallur is a major residential locality of the city of Coimbatore in Tamil Nadu, India. It is located on the banks of Noyyal river, which runs to the southern boundary of the locality. It is one of the well developed neighborhoods in the city and has been part of Coimbatore Corporation since 1981. The East Zone Office of Coimbatore City Municipal Corporation is located at Singanallur.

Etymology
According to the Chola poorva pattayam, the name "Singanallur" is derived from the name of a Chola queen "Singarammal", mother of Karikala Chola in 2nd century AD and the village being donated as "Chadurvedi Mangalam" by the emperor to the priestly class.

History

Singanallur Municipality was merged with Coimbatore Municipality to form the Coimbatore Municipal Corporation in 1982. Singanallur Municipality covered the localities such as Singanallur, SIHS Colony, Neelikonampalayam, Peelamedu, Uppilipalayam, Kallimadai and Ondipudur until the merger with Coimbatore Municipality in 1982 with a population of over 2.75 lakhs (as per 1981 census).Singanallur is one of the main happening hubs in Coimbatore.

Geography

Singanallur is located at a distance of 9 km from the centre of the city, Townhall.The nerve centre of Singanallur is Trichy Road. This road passes through the centre point of Singanallur. Other major roads include Kamarajar Road, Neelikonampalayam Road, Vellalore Road and Masakalipalayam Road. It is located about 9.5 km from Townhall, the centre of the city, 7 km from the Coimbatore International Airport and about 8 km from City railway station, 9 km from Gandhipuram Central Bus Terminus and 10 km from Podanur railway station and is well connected to local bus services to various parts of the city. Singanallur shares its border with Ramanathapuram, Ondipudur, Vellalore,  Uppilipalayam, Masakalipalayam, Varadharajapuram, Neelikonampalayam, Kallimadai , Nanjundapuram and SIHS Colony.

Infrastructure

Trichy Road Flyover
The Trichy Road Flyover is opened in 2022 between Kallimadai to Sungam.

Singanallur Flyover
A four-lane flyover is proposed in Singanallur to avoid traffic congestion.

Singanallur-Vellalore Road Flyover
A two-lane flyover was opened in 2015 to avoid traffic congestion, caused by railway line between Irugur Junction and Podanur Junction.

Locality
Singanallur is one of the well connected and well developed localities in Coimbatore.

Major Religious Spots
Ulagalanda Perumal Temple, a 2000 year old temple
Pudu Raja Temple
Singanallur Masjid
Mariamman Temple
Aravan Temple
Plague Mariamman Temple
Csi Immanuel Church Singanallur
Old ERS Church
Muthumariamman Temple
Badrakaliamman Temple 
Bhajanai temple

Landmarks
Singanallur Bus Terminus
ESIC Medical College, Coimbatore
Farmers Market
Coimbatore City Municipal Corporation East Zone Office
Coimbatore City Boat House
Singanallur Railway Station
Shanthi Social Services
Singanallur Urban Health Care Centre

Commercial Sector
Commercial shops established on Singanallur include:
 Sathya Agencies
 D Mart
 Shree Kannan Departmental Stores
 Max
 Trends
 Indian Antique Quest 
 Peter England
 Indian Terrain
 Ramraj Cotton
 Chennai Mobiles
 Poorvika
 Bharath Electronics
 MI Exclusive Store

Schools
Perks Matriculation School
Venkatalaxmi Matriculation School
SSVM World School
 St Joseph's School
Annai Velankanni Matriculation Higher Secondary School

Restaurants
Aloft International
Thalappakati Biriyani
Aditi Restaurant
Absolute Biriyani
Kovai Chilli Chicken Centre
Nalans Kitchen "Thattu Kadai"
Hotel Chola
Hotel Lakshmi Narayana

Banks
 City Union Bank
 Axis Bank
 Union Bank Singanallur-1
 Union Bank Singanallur-2
 HDFC Bank
 ICICI Bank
 Canara Bank
 Indian Bank
 State Bank of India
 Karur Vysya Bank
 Bank of Baroda
 Central Bank of India
 Catholic Syrian Bank
 CDCC Bank
 Vijaya Bank
 Indian Overseas Bank

Hospitals
ESIC Medical College, Coimbatore
NG Hospital
Muthus Hospital
Child Care Hospital
Coimbatore Corporation Homeopathy Hospital
VGM Hospital
Ortho One Hospital

Singanallur Lake
Singanallur Lake is a lake in Singanallur, Coimbatore, South India and is recognised as a biodiversity conservation zone in 2013 by the city corporation. It is one of the 9 large lakes in the city. A new variety of butterfly was named after Singanallur as Singanallurensis.

Transport

Singanallur Mofussil Bus Terminus
Singanallur Bus Terminus, one of the major bus terminus in the city is located here. It handles buses towards:
 Moffussil buses towards Madurai, Theni, Tiruchirappalli, Nagercoil, Kumbakonam, and Rameswaram.

Singanallur has easy access to :
 Gandhipuram : Via Kamarajar Road and Avinashi Road
 Coimbatore Integrated Bus Terminus : Via Vellalore Road
 Ukkadam : Via  Western Trichy Road and Sungam Bypass Road
 Railway Station : Via Western Trichy Road
 Coimbatore International Airport : Via Singanallur - Aerodrome Road

Coimbatore Metro
Coimbatore Metro feasibility study is completed and one of the route planned from Karanampettai to Thaneerpandal via Singanallur covering 42 km.

Politics 
The locality of Singanallur is a part of Singanallur Assembly constituency and Coimbatore (Lok Sabha constituency).

References

Neighbourhoods in Coimbatore